BCH or BCh may refer to:

Science and technology
 BCH code (Bose–Chaudhuri–Hocquenghem code), a code in coding theory
 Bachelor of Surgery, a component of some undergraduate medical degrees
 Baker–Campbell–Hausdorff formula, in mathematics and Lie group theory 
 Biosafety Clearing-House, an international mechanism that exchanges information about the movement of genetically modified organisms
 Birdsell Clover Huller, an agricultural machine
 Bitcoin Cash, a fork of the cryptocurrency Bitcoin
 Bean chitinase, a defensive enzyme

Organisations
 Birmingham Children's Hospital, a hospital in England
 Boston Children’s Hospital, a hospital in Boston, Massachusetts
 Blue Castle Holdings, developer of nuclear power stations in the US
 British and Commonwealth Holdings, a defunct UK financial services company 
 Briefmarken-Club_Hannover_von_1886, a German stamp collectors club founded 1886
 Bataliony Chłopskie, a Polish resistance movement in World War II
 Belfast City Hospital, a hospital in Northern Ireland
 Central Bank of Honduras (Spanish: Banco Central de Honduras)

Transportation
 Baucau Airport (IATA code), East Timor
 Belarusian Railway (BCh), (Belarusian: Беларуская чыгунка), the state railway company of Belarus
 Birchington-on-Sea railway station, England
 British Columbia Hydro and Power Authority (railway reporting mark)
 Bch, short for "Beach"; a Street suffix as used in the US

Other uses
 Barclays Cycle Hire, former name of a public bicycle sharing scheme in London, England

See also
 Broadcast control channel (BCCH), a control channel in GSM Um Radio Interface